Winokur is a Jewish surname that is a spelling variant or Germanized variant of the East Slavic surname Vinokur. It may refer to:

 Harry Winokur, American businessman and founder of the Mister Donut chain of doughnut shops
 Jon Winokur (born 1947), American writer and editor
 Marissa Jaret Winokur (born 1973), American actress

See also
 
Vinokur
Vinokurov

Surnames
Jewish surnames